Alfred Lord Fitch (December 1, 1912 – February 17, 1981) was an American athlete who competed mainly in the 400 metres.

He was born in New York and died in Orange, California.

He competed for the United States in the 1936 Summer Olympics held in Berlin, Germany in the 4 x 400 metre relay where he won the silver medal with his team mates Harold Cagle, Robert Young and Edward O’Brien.

External links
 
 

1912 births
1981 deaths
American male sprinters
Athletes (track and field) at the 1936 Summer Olympics
Olympic silver medalists for the United States in track and field
Medalists at the 1936 Summer Olympics